Christoffer Hiding (born 25 December 1985 in Göteborg but raised in Alingsås) is a Swedish singer who took part in the Swedish Idol 2007 finishing 6th place. His cover version of Nelly Furtado's "Say It Right" was a minor hit for him reaching #53 on the Swedish Singles Chart.

In 2011, Hiding took part in Melodifestivalen singing alongside Swingfly to the song  "Me and My Drum" at the Globe Arena finals in Stockholm, coming 5th overall. Swingfly raps the verses, whereas Christoffer sings the chorus in the song. He released his debut music video for "Shine On" which is from his 2013 album, Yes, Higher!.

Discography

Albums
2014: Yes, Higher!

Singles
2007: "Say It Right" – #53 Sweden
2012: "Shine On"

As featured artist
2011: "Me and My Drum" (Swingfly feat. Christoffer Hiding) – #3 Sweden
2011: "Little Did I Know" (Swingfly feat. Pauline and Christoffer Hiding)

References

1985 births
Living people
Swedish pop singers
21st-century Swedish singers
21st-century Swedish male singers
Melodifestivalen contestants of 2011